Peralam Junction railway station is a railway junction station serving the village of Peralam in Tamil Nadu, India.

Background
The railway station became functional when the Peralam–Karaikal line was opened by Great South Indian Railway (which was later merged with South Indian Railway Company) on 14 March 1898.

Lines

References

External links
 Indiarailinfo

Trichy railway division
Railway stations in Thiruvarur district
Railway stations in India opened in 1898
Railway junction stations in Tamil Nadu